Azov Avia Airlines was a cargo airline based in Melitopol, Ukraine offering chartered flights using two Ilyushin Il-76MD aircraft. The airline was established and started operations in 1996, and ceased to exist in 2004.

References

Defunct airlines of Ukraine
Airlines established in 1996
Airlines disestablished in 2004
Defunct cargo airlines
Cargo airlines of Ukraine